Dudek Paragliders (until 26 May 2006 called Dudek Paragliding) is a Polish aircraft manufacturer based near Bydgoszcz and founded by Piotr Dudek, Wojtek Domanski, and Darek Filipowicz on August 22, 1995. The company specializes in the design and manufacture of paragliders, rescue parachutes and paragliding harnesses.

In 2016 the two managing partners of the company were Wojtek Domanski and Piotr Dudek.

Domanski has been the leader of Polish Paramotor Team at the World and European Championships since 2005 and was the sport director of the World Paramotor Championships that were held at Łomża in 2008. He was also the Polish delegate to CIMA microlight committee and in 2010, was elected president of the paramotor subcommittee at CIMA. He is the founder of the European Paramotor League project, which later became the World League Cup.

Piotr Dudek has been paragliding since 1987 and is an instructor and competition pilot, flying in the 1995 World Championships held in Verbier, on a paraglider he designed and constructed.

The company was initially noted for its paramotor wings, but later branched into soaring and alpine decent wings.

The company has produced a wide range of paragliders, including the beginner Dudek Rex, the intermediate Vox, Max and Shark, the competition Lux and Action and the two-pace Twix.

The company's design of the Dudek Run&Fly alpine decent wing was noted by Cross Country magazine for its light weight of 968 grams in the 16 square metre size.

The Dudek V-King is a dual purpose single-skin wing designed for soaring and also for paramotoring use. A Cross Country review praised the company's design for its performance and flexibility.

Aircraft 

Summary of aircraft built by Dudek Paragliders:

Dudek Action
Dudek Air-Light
Dudek Alt
Dudek Atak
Dudek Bi-Light
Dudek Coden
Dudek Coden Pro
Dudek Colt 2
Dudek Condor
Dudek Elf
Dudek Freeway
Dudek Guliwer
Dudek Hadron
Dudek Jumbo
Dudek Lux
Dudek Mach 1.1
Dudek Manta
Dudek Marlin
Dudek Max
Dudek Nemo
Dudek Nucleon
Dudek Optic 2
Dudek Orca 4
Dudek Patrol
Dudek Plasma
Dudek Plus
Dudek Reaction
Dudek Reportair
Dudek Rex
Dudek Run&Fly
Dudek Shark
Dudek Snake
Dudek Synthesis
Dudek Top
Dudek Traper
Dudek Twix
Dudek Universal
Dudek Vip
Dudek V-King
Dudek Vox
Dudek Wezyr
Dudek Zagzig
Dudek ZakoSpeed

References

External links

Aircraft manufacturers of Poland
Paragliders